Lonnie Napier (born May 24, 1940) is an American politician from the Republican Party (GOP). Napier served from 1985 to 2013 in the Kentucky House of Representatives.

Known as "The Fox" to friends and foes alike, Napier began his political career in his native Garrard County, Kentucky at age 26 with a term on the county's governing body, where he served from 1967 to 1969. Napier won the seat in a special election by defeating a candidate backed by the local Republican Party machine.
In 1971, Napier challenged veteran state Representative Joe Clarke for the 54th district state House seat, a race which he lost.

Napier won election to the Kentucky House of Representatives on November 6, 1984, having defeated his Democratic opponent by nearly a 2:1 margin, and has been re-elected every two years since. Napier serves on the Appropriations and Revenue Committee, which has enabled him to steer millions in state funds to his district over the years. In 2007, Napier was the target of an effort to draft him into the primary election for Kentucky Governor against embattled incumbent Ernie Fletcher. Napier announced in January 2007 that he would not be a candidate for governor but would instead run for Kentucky State Treasurer. Despite raising the most money out of the four candidates in the GOP primary for state Treasurer, Napier lost the nomination on May 22, 2007, to Melinda Wheeler. After running unopposed for several cycles, Napier was challenged in both the primary and general elections in 2010, but defeated both opponents by wide margins to win a fourteenth term.

In addition to having a successful career in politics, Napier is also a small businessman, operating a clothing store in Lancaster (his hometown) as well as an auctioneering and real estate business.

Some cities and towns represented
Bryantsville
Cartersvile
Lancaster
Paint Lick
Berea
Waco
Red Lick

References

Members of the Kentucky House of Representatives
1940 births
Living people
People from Lancaster, Kentucky